Lehigh Valley Railroad Station is a historic railway station located at 806 West Buffalo Street, Ithaca in Tompkins County, New York.

The Passenger Station and Freight Station were designed by local architect A. B. Wood and built in 1898 by the Lehigh Valley Railroad. The Passenger Station is a Classical Revival structure with a Romanesque feeling. It is a massive square building with extensions and sheltering roofs for baggage operations. At one corner is the entrance marquee and a four sided street clock mounted in a Corinthian column. The main waiting room section has a hipped roof and features a pedimented porte cochere. The Freight Station is a long, gray painted frame building with a two-story clapboarded section and a long freight storage part. Lehigh Valley passenger trains making stops there included the Black Diamond, Maple Leaf and Star.

It was used as a passenger station until February 4, 1961. In 1966, local resident Joseph O. Ciaschi, an early local leader in the historic preservation movement, converted the abandoned building into a restaurant. Known as The Station, the restaurant operated until September, 2005, when it was closed and the building was converted for use as a branch office of the Chemung Canal Trust Company: an Elmira-based bank.

The building was listed on the National Register of Historic Places in 1974.

References

External links

Railway stations on the National Register of Historic Places in New York (state)
Historic American Buildings Survey in New York (state)
Former Lehigh Valley Railroad stations
Buildings and structures in Ithaca, New York
Railway stations in the United States opened in 1898
Railway stations closed in 1961
1898 establishments in New York (state)
1961 disestablishments in New York (state)
National Register of Historic Places in Tompkins County, New York
Bank buildings in New York (state)